Philippe-François-Joseph Le Bas (4 November 1764, Frévent, Pas-de-Calais – 28 July 1794, Paris) was a French politician and revolutionary.

Biography
The son of a notary, intendant to the prince de Rache, avocat to the parliament of 1789, companion and collaborator of Saint-Just, Le Bas was elected député to the National Convention for the Pas-de-Calais in 1792, sitting among the Montagnards. A discreet, cold, and loyal representative, he voted for King Louis XVI's death and against the sentence at his trial (i.e., against the people's appeal). Le Bas and Duquesnoy were delegated to the armée du Nord in August 1793, and Le Bas proceeded with the arrest of generals Richardot and O'Moran for inability. A member of the Committee of General Security, he was among those close to Robespierre, Couthon, and Saint-Just, who had a brief and discreet relation with his sister Henriette.

He and Saint-Just were made the Convention's commissioners to the armies and set out on this mission to eastern France, where he reorganized the army after its reverses at Wissembourg. Saint-Just and Le Bas were also later sent to reorganize the armée du Nord by the Committee of Public Safety in the face of an attempted return by Austrian forces after Wattignies - it was this reorganisation that made possible the victory at Fleurus. Since 1 June he was appointed as  the director of the "École de Mars", formerly known as the École Militaire.

Death
Faithful to Robespierre, Augustin Robespierre and Le Bas demanded to share his fate. The five deputies were taken to the Committee of General Security, questioned and then escorted to different prisons; LeBas to the Conciergerie. The mayor of the Commune ordered the janitors to refuse any member of the Convention. LeBas, as well as the others gathered in the Hôtel de Ville on 9 Thermidor. When the anti-Robespierristes under Barras and Léonard Bourdon broke into the main room of the townhall (where Le Bas had taken refuge with Maximilien Robespierre, Augustin Robespierre, St-Just and Couthon) LeBas committed suicide by pistol in the early morning of 10 Thermidor.

Marriage and issue
He married Elisabeth Duplay, daughter of Maurice Duplay, Robespierre's landlord in Paris, and their son was Philippe Le Bas (1794–1860), who would be Louis-Napoléon Bonaparte's preceptor until 1827 then director of the library of the Sorbonne (from 1844 to 1860), a member of the Académie des Inscriptions et Belles-Lettres (1838–60) and president of the Institut de France (from 1858).

Bibliography 
  Stéfane-Pol, Elisabeth Duplay Le Bas, Autour de Robespierre: Le conventionnel Le Bas, d'après des documents inédits et les mémoires de sa veuve, E. Flammarion, 1901, 340 pages

1762 births
1794 deaths
People from Pas-de-Calais
Suicides by firearm in France
French politicians who committed suicide
Deputies to the French National Convention
Regicides of Louis XVI
18th-century French lawyers
Jacobins
People on the Committee of Public Safety
Représentants en mission
18th-century suicides